Khaki-ye Shekarabad (also Romanized as Khākī-ye Shekarābād; also known as Khākī-ye Pīzūl Mālagh) is a village in Kakavand-e Gharbi Rural District, Kakavand District, Delfan County, Lorestan Province, Iran. At the 2006 census, its population was 118, in 21 families.

References 

Towns and villages in Delfan County